Caroline Wennergren, (born 21 September 1985 in Rio de Janeiro, Brazil) is a Swedish-Brazilian singer. She participated at Melodifestivalen 2005 with the song A Different Kind of Love, which ended up fifth in the final. She participated in Melodifestivalen 2015 with the song Black Swan.

Discography

Studio albums
2005 – Bossa Supernova
2011 – Drop me Off in Harlem

Singles
2005 – A Different Kind of Love
2005 – Doing the Bossa Supernova
2005 – You And I
2010 – "Love"
2011 – "A Tisket a Tasket"

References 

1985 births
Living people
Brazilian emigrants to Sweden
Swedish people of Brazilian descent
Swedish adoptees
21st-century Swedish singers
21st-century Swedish women singers
Melodifestivalen contestants of 2015
Melodifestivalen contestants of 2005